This is a list of Microsoft written and published operating systems. For the codenames that Microsoft gave their operating systems, see Microsoft codenames. For another list of versions of Microsoft Windows, see, List of Microsoft Windows versions.

MS-DOS
 See MS-DOS Versions for a full list.

Windows

Windows 1.0 until 8.1

Windows 10/11 and Windows Server 2016/2019/2022

Windows Mobile 

 Windows Mobile 2003
 Windows Mobile 2003 SE
 Windows Mobile 5
 Windows Mobile 6

Windows Phone

Xbox gaming
Xbox system software
Xbox 360 system software
Xbox One and Xbox Series X/S system software

OS/2

Unix and Unix-like
 Xenix
 Nokia X platform
 Microsoft Linux distributions
 Azure Sphere
 SONiC
 Windows Subsystem for Linux
 CBL-Mariner

Other operating systems
 MS-Net
 LAN Manager
 MIDAS
 Singularity
Midori
 Zune
 KIN OS
 Nokia Asha platform
 Barrelfish

Time line

See also
 List of Microsoft topics
 List of operating systems

External links
Concise Microsoft O.S. Timeline, by Bravo Technology Center

Micro

Operating systems